SAMI is a state-owned defense company launched in May 2017 by Saudi Arabia’s Public Investment Fund (PIF).

Activities 

SAMI was established to provide defense products and services in Saudi Arabia and to reduce the country’s reliance on foreign purchases of defense products.

The company operates across aerospace, electronics, defense systems, sea, and land systems.

SAMI’s reported targets include the contribution of 14 billion riyals (US$3.7 billion) to the Saudi economy by 2030, 6 billion riyals (US$1.6 billion) investment in research and development and the creation of 40,000 jobs.

Partnerships 

In May 2017, SAMI signed Memoranda of Understanding (MoU) with defense contractors Boeing, Lockheed Martin, Raytheon and General Dynamics.

In October 2017, SAMI signed a Memorandum of Understanding with Russia's Rosoboronexport to manufacture military equipment in Saudi Arabia. The agreement provides for the transfer of technology for the local production of the S-400, the Kornet-EM system, the TOS-1A, the AGS-30 and the Kalashnikov AK-103.

In January 2018, on the sidelines of the launch of the National Industrial Development and Logistics Program, SAMI inked the establishment of two new joint ventures with Thales and CMI Defence. The scope of the joint venture signed with Thales includes Short range air defense and counter-rockets radars, C2s, multi-mission missiles, fuses for guided bombs, and inter-communication radios. The project aims to invest in the facilities and equipment in the local market, at a localization ratio of 70%, while around 2,000 direct and indirect jobs will be generated for Saudi youth. The second joint venture agreement, which is signed with CMI Defence, includes delivering multifunctional high-power turret systems for armored vehicles and all related services, providing in-country research and development and prototyping, design and systems engineering, supplier and material management, manufacturing, assembly and test, fielding and support, and upgrades, and integration of other OEM products and services. The project is expected to realize a localization rate of 60%, in addition to offering more than 700 direct and indirect jobs for the Saudi youth.

In November 2018, SAMI and Navantia. announced the launch of their joint venture, ‘SAMI Navantia Naval Industries,’ following the agreement signed by both parties to design and build 5 Avante 2200 corvettes with Combat Management System for the Ministry of Defense of Saudi Arabia. SAMI Navantia Naval Industries will focus on program management and naval combat system integration, system engineering and architecture, hardware design, and software development, testing and verification, prototyping, simulation, and modelling, in addition to the installation and integration of combat systems on the last two vessels of the Avante 2200 project, as well as the logistical support and training programs.

In February 2019, SAMI and Naval Group, have entered into a Memorandum of Agreement to create a joint venture company in Saudi Arabia’s naval defense domain.

See also 

 Military Industries Corporation (Saudi Arabia)

References

External links
 

Manufacturing companies established in 2017
Government-owned companies of Saudi Arabia
Defence companies of Saudi Arabia
2017 establishments in Saudi Arabia
Companies based in Riyadh